Queen Jangsun (22 February 1445 – 5 January 1462), of the Cheongju Han clan, personal name was Han Naeng-Yi (한냉이) and also known as Crown Princess Consort Jangsun (장순빈) during her lifetime. She was the first wife of Yejong of Joseon.

Life

Early life 
Han Naeng-yi was born on 22 February 1445 into the Cheongju Han clan to Han Myeong-hoe and his wife, Lady Min of the Yeoheung Min clan. She was the third child of five children. Her mother was a cousin of Queen Jeongsun’s mother, as well as her maternal grandfather who was also the maternal granduncle of the queen; making her and the Queen be first cousins. Her paternal grand aunt was the great-grandmother of Queen Jeonghyeon. Her younger sister would eventually become Queen.

Life as crown princess 
At the age of 15, Lady Han was chosen to be the wife and Crown Princess Consort of King Yejong, known then as Yi Hwang, Grand Prince Haeyang, in 1460. She is said to have been favored by her father-in-law King Sejo for her quiet character and beautiful appearance. On 31 December 1461, 30 November 1461 in the lunar calendar, she gave birth to Wonson (Yejong's eldest son, Grand Prince Inseong).

Death 
The Crown Princess later died five days later in her quarters from postpartum sickness at the age of 16. 

King Sejo was saddened by the death of his daughter-in-law, who he considered his favorite daughter-in-law. She was called from Princess Jangsun to Crown Princess Jangsun. 

For her posthumous title, “Jang” (Hangul: 장, Hanja: 章) was for being gentle, generous, and beautiful. “Sun” (Hangul: 순, Hanja: 順) was for  being docile and self-benevolent; becoming Crown Princess Jangsun (Hangul: 장순빈, Hanja: 章順嬪). When her brother-in-law and step son-in-law, King Seongjong, ascended the throne, her posthumous title changed to Queen Jangsun (Hangul: 장순왕후, Hanja: 章順王后).

Her tomb is Gongneung located in Samneung, Paju, Bongilcheon-ri, Jojo-eup, Paju-si, Gyeonggi-do. It is said that she was honored as Queen and was given a ritual worthy rite. She said to be an example for queens to follow.

Her only son, Grand Prince Inseong, died two years later.

Aftermath 
The Crown Princess’ younger sister, Han Song-yi at 10 years old, was arranged to marry Yi Hyeol, Grand Prince Jalsan, Crown Prince Uigyeong’s and Crown Princess Consort Su’s youngest son, on 12 January 1467. As the grand prince’s wife, her royal title became “Princess Consort Cheonan” (Hangul: 천안군부인).

With her father’s influence, Jalsan became the 9th ruler of the Joseon Dynasty in 1469 (later honoured as King Seongjong), which then changed her younger sister’s status from princess consort to queen consort.

The young Queen unfortunately faced the same fate as her older sister and died from an illness at the age of 17 on 30 April 1474.

King Seongjong gave the posthumous title of using “Gong” (Hangul: 공, Hanja: 恭) on praising and docilely serving her in-law’s, and used “Hye” (Hangul: 혜, Hanja: 惠) for her generosity, tenderness, and kindness; becoming Queen Gonghye (Hangul: 공혜왕후, Hanja: 恭惠王后).

Family
 Father − Han Myeong-hoe (26 November 1415 – 28 November 1487) (한명회)
 Uncle − Han Myeong-jin (한명진, 韓明溍) (1426 - 1454)
Aunt - Lady Kwon of the Andong Kwon clan (안동 권씨)
 Unnamed male cousin
 Cousin - Lady Han of the Cheongju Han clan (청주 한씨, 淸州 韓氏)
 a) Grandfather − Han Gi (1393 – 1429) (한기, 韓起)
 b) Great-Grandfather − Han Sang-jil (한상질, 韓尙質) (1350 - 1400)
 c) Great-Great-Grandfather − Han Soo (한수, 韓脩) (1333 - 1384)
 c) Great-Great-Grandmother − Lady Kwon of the Andong Kwon clan (안동 권씨, 安東 權氏)
 b) Great-Grandmother − Lady Song of the Cheongpung Song clan (청풍 송씨, 昌化夫人 淸風 宋氏); Han Sang-jil’s second wife
 a) Grandmother − Lady Yi of the Yeoju Yi clan (증 정경부인 여주 이씨, 贈 貞敬夫人 驪州李氏)
 Mother − Internal Princess Consort Hwangryeo of the Yeoheung Min clan (? – 1479/1490) (황려부부인 여흥 민씨, 黃驪府夫人 驪興 閔氏)
 a) Grandfather − Min Dae-Saeng (1372 – 1467) (민대생, 閔大生)
 a) Grandmother − Lady Heo of the Yangcheon Heo clan (양천 허씨, 陽川 許氏)
 Siblings
 Older sister − Lady Han of the Cheongju Han clan (청주 한씨, 淸州 韓氏)
 Brother-in-law - Shin Ju (신주, 申澍) of the Goryeong Shin clan (고령 신씨, 高靈 申氏)
 Nephew − Shin Jong-ho (신종호, 申從濩) (1456 - 1497)
 Grandnephew − Shin Hang (신항, 申沆) (1477 - 1507)
 Grandniece-in-law - Princess Hyesuk (혜숙옹주, 惠淑翁主) (1478 - ?); King Seongjong’s eldest daughter
 Older sister − Lady Han of the Cheongju Han clan (청주 한씨, 淸州 韓氏)
 Brother-in-law - Yun Ban (윤반, 尹磻) of the Papyeong Yun clan (파평 윤씨, 坡平 尹氏)
 Younger brother - Han Bo (한보, 韓堡) (1447 - 1522)
 Sister-in-law - Lady Yi of the Hansan Yi clan (한산 이씨)
 Nephew − Han Gyeong-gi (한경기, 韓景琦) (1472 - 1529)
 Niece-in-law - Lady Yi of the Jeonju Yi clan (숙인 전주 이씨, 淑人 全州 李氏)
 Niece-in-law - Lady Kim of the Eonyang Kim clan (숙인 언양 김씨, 淑人 彦陽 金氏)
 Grandnephew - Han Hyeob (한협, 韓勰)
 Grandnephew - Han Song (한숭, 韓嵩)
 Nephew - Han Gyeong-jong (한경종, 韓景琮)
 Niece-in-law - Lady Kim of the Hamjong Kim clan (함종 김씨)
 Grandnephew - Han Hyeon (한현, 韓絢)
 Nephew − Han Gyeong-chim (한경침, 韓景琛) (1482 - ?)
 Niece-in-law - Princess Gongshin (공신옹주, 恭愼翁主) (11 March 1481 - 7 February 1549); King Seongjong’s third daughter
 Grandnephew - Han Chan (한찬, 韓瓚)
 Grandnephew - Han Kang (한강, 韓綱)
 Nephew - Han Gyeong-hwan (한경환, 韓景環)
 Grandnephew - Han Yu (한유, 韓維)
 Grandnephew - Han Yu (한유, 韓績)
 Nephew - Han Gyeong-sun (한경순, 韓景珣)
 Grandnephew - Han Jeok (한작, 韓綽)
 Nephew - Han Gyeong-ham (한경함, 韓景{王+咸})
 Younger sister - Queen Gonghye of the Cheongju Han clan (공혜왕후 한씨) (8 November 1456 - 30 April 1474)
 Brother-in-law - Yi Hyeol, King Seongjong (20 August 1457 – 20 January 1494) (조선 성종)
 Husband
 Yi Hwang, King Yejong (조선 예종) (14 January 1450 - 31 April 1469) 
 Father-in-law - Yi Yu, King Sejo (조선 세조) (2 November 1417 - 23 September 1468)
 Mother-in-law - Queen Jeonghui of the Paepyeong Yun clan (정희왕후 윤씨) (8 December 1418 - 6 May 1483)
 Children
 Son - Yi Bun, Grand Prince Inseong (인성대군 이분, 仁城大君 李糞) (31 December 1461 - 4 December 1463)
 Adoptive grandson - Yi Seok, Prince Jeokseong (적성군 이석) (1484 - 1539)
 Adoptive grandson - Yi Ong, Prince Seoseong of the Third Junior Rank (서성부정 이옹) (1487 - 1510)
 Stepson - Yi Hyeol, Grand Prince Jalsan (조선 성종) (19 August 1457 - 19 January 1495)
 Step daughter-in-law - Queen Gonghye of the Cheongju Han clan (공혜왕후 한씨) (8 November 1456 - 30 April 1474) — No issue.
 Step daughter-in-law - Queen Jeheon of the Haman Yun clan (제헌왕후 윤씨) (15 July 1455 - 29 August 1482)
 Step grandson - Prince Yi Hyo-Shin (1475) (이효신)
 Step grandson - Yi Yung, Crown Prince Yeonsan (23 November 1476 – 20 November 1506) (이융 연산세자)
 Unnamed grandson (? - 1479)
 Step daughter-in-law - Queen Jeonghyeon of the Paepyeong Yun clan (정현왕후 윤씨) (21 July 1462 - 13 September 1530)
 Step granddaughter - Princess Sunsuk (1478 – 14 July 1488) (순숙공주)
 Unnamed step granddaughter (1481 – 1486)
 Step grandson - Yi Yeok, Grand Prince Jinseong (16 April 1488 – 29 November 1544) (이역 진성대군)
 Unnamed step granddaughter (1490 - 1490)

See also
Yejong of Joseon
Queen Ansun
Queen Gonghye
Han Myeong-hoe

References

External links
Queen Jangsun in Encykorea. .
Queen Jangsun in The Dong-A Ilbo. .

15th-century Korean people
Deaths in childbirth